Kim Dong-gyu (born 7 June 1925) was a South Korean equestrian. He competed in the individual jumping event at the 1960 Summer Olympics.

References

External links
  

1925 births
Possibly living people
South Korean male equestrians
Olympic equestrians of South Korea
Equestrians at the 1960 Summer Olympics
Sportspeople from Seoul